Leo Dynevor (born 13 February 1974) is an Australian former professional rugby league footballer who played in the 1990s. He played for the London Broncos in 1996, the Newcastle Knights in 1997 and finally the Western Suburbs Magpies from 1998 to 1999.

Playing career
Dynevor began his first grade career in England with the London Broncos.  In 1997, Dynevor signed with Newcastle and played 19 games for them including the preliminary final victory over North Sydney but was not included in the grand final side which defeated Manly-Warringah the following week.

In 1998, Dynevor signed with Western Suburbs.  Dynevor spent 2 unsuccessful seasons for Wests as they finished last in 1998 and 1999.  Dynevor's final game in first grade was a 68-10 loss against Parramatta in Round 20 1999.  At the end of 1999, Western Suburbs merged with fellow foundation club Balmain to form the Wests Tigers but Dynevor was not one of the Western Suburbs players offered a contract to play with the new team.

References

1974 births
Living people
Australian rugby league players
Australian expatriate sportspeople in England
Western Suburbs Magpies players
Nelson Bay Blues players
Kurri Kurri Bulldogs players
London Broncos players
Newcastle Knights players
Indigenous Australian rugby league players
Rugby league five-eighths
Rugby league halfbacks
Rugby league players from Queensland